Shue Meei-Shya (born 6 June 1949) is a Taiwanese archer who competed in the 1972 Summer Olympic Games in archery.

Olympics 

She finished 38th in the women's individual event with a score of 2026 points.

References

External links 
 Profile on worldarchery.org
 Press photo of Shue (at right) with her teammate Weng Wu Chin-shu (published in the Central Daily News on 9 July 1976

1949 births
Living people
Taiwanese female archers
Olympic archers of Taiwan
Archers at the 1972 Summer Olympics
20th-century Taiwanese women